Repaupo is an unincorporated community located within Logan Township in Gloucester County, New Jersey, United States. Repaupo can be accessed by Interstate 295/U.S. Route 130, via exit 14.

The community was settled in the 17th century by Swedes from the former colony of New Sweden. Men such as Andreas Anderson, former trumpeter to Governor Printz, was one of the prominent settlers.

Notable Person

People who were born in, residents of, or otherwise closely associated with Repaupo include:
 Edward Durr (born 1963), politician and truck driver who represents the 3rd Legislative district in the New Jersey Senate.

References

Logan Township, New Jersey
Unincorporated communities in Gloucester County, New Jersey
Unincorporated communities in New Jersey